Anthony Patrick James McGuinness, (born 23 April 1969) is a British trance musician. He is known for being in the electronic music group Above & Beyond. He is also a guitarist/songwriter with cult indie band Sad Lovers & Giants.

Biography
Tony McGuinness plays guitar with English indie band Sad Lovers & Giants, appearing on three albums between 1988 and 2002 and is still an active member having toured US and Europe regularly with them since 2009.

McGuinness was also a highly successful marketing director for Warner Music Group, winning awards for his campaigns for Madonna, Seal, Simply Red and Mike Oldfield. While working at Warner, McGuinness shifted away from alternative rock towards electronic dance music. He worked as A&R for a number of dance artists, including William Orbit and Hysteric Ego.

Tony McGuinness and his brother Liam teamed up to create electronic dance music under the alias Nitromethane since the early 2000s. While still working at Warner, Tony was asked to remix Chakra's "Home" by an A&R colleague.

McGuinness approached Anjunabeats (Jono Grant and Paavo Siljamäki) to work on the remix together. The result, their remix of "Home", was an instant hit, topping the dance charts for many weeks. The collaboration led to the creation of Above & Beyond, consisting of McGuinness, Grant, and Siljamäki.

Above & Beyond's second studio album, Group Therapy, features McGuinness' first ever vocal single (with Richard Bedford) on the track "Black Room Boy".

McGuinness became an Irish citizen in 2012.

Discography

Singles
2002 Time to Die (as Nitromethane)

Productions as a part of Above & Beyond:
2002 Far from in Love
2004 No One on Earth
2005 Air for Life
2006 Alone Tonight
2006 Can't Sleep
2007 Good for Me
2007 Home
2009 Anjunabeach
2010 Anphonic
2011 Sun & Moon
2011 Thing Called Love
2011 You Got To Go
2011 Formula Rossa
2011 Every Little Beat
2012 Love Is Not Enough
2012 On My Way To Heaven
2012 Alchemy
2013 Walter White
2014 Sticky Fingers
2014 You Got to Believe
2014 Blue Sky Action
2014 We're All We Need
2015 All Over the World
2015 Peace of Mind
2015 Counting Down the Days
2015 Fly to New York

Productions as a part of Tranquility Base:
2001 Razorfish
2004 Surrender
2005 Getting Away
2007 Oceanic
2007 Buzz

Productions as a part of OceanLab:
2001 Clear Blue Water
2002 Sky Falls Down
2003 Beautiful Together
2004 Satellite
2004 Sky Falls Down

Productions as a part of Rollerball:
2003 Albinoni
2004 Albinoni (Remix)

Albums with Above & Beyond:
2006 Tri-State
2008 Sirens of the Sea (as Above & Beyond presents OceanLab)
2011 Group Therapy
2015 We Are All We Need
2018 Common Ground

Remixes
2000 What It Feels Like for a Girl (as Above & Beyond)
2002 M (as Above & Beyond)
2004 Sand in My Shoes / Don't Leave Home (as Above & Beyond)
2006 Black Is the Colour (as Above & Beyond)
2007 Home (as Tony)

Anjunabeats:
2003 Anjunabeats Volume One
2004 Anjunabeats Volume Two
2005 Anjunabeats Volume Three
2006 Anjunabeats Volume Four
2007 Anjunabeats Volume Five
2008 Anjunabeats100 + From Goa to Rio
2008 Anjunabeats Volume Six
2009 Anjunadeep:01
2009 Anjunabeats Volume 7
2010 Anjunabeats Volume 8
2011 10 Years of Anjunabeats

Other productions
Upon becoming a member of the band Sad Lovers & Giants in 1986, Tony McGuinness had a successful career in the music industry.  Their discography includes the following albums:
1988 Epic Garden Music
1988 Feeding the Flame
1988 Les Années Vertes
1988 Sleep / A Reflected Dream
1988 The Mirror Test
1990 Headland
1991 Les Années Vertes
1991 Treehouse Poetry
1996 The Best of E-Mail from Eternity
1999 La Dolce Vita (Live in Lausanne)
2000 Headland & Treehouse Poetry
2002 Melting in the Fullness of Time
2018 Mission Creep

As a part of Oceanlab, Above & Beyond, Anjunabeats, Rollerball and Tranquility Base, Tony McGuinness produced numerous tracks as a team under the label Anjunabeats.

References

External links

1959 births
Living people
English rock guitarists
English male guitarists
English record producers
English dance musicians
English DJs
Electronic dance music DJs